Pahiram ng Isang Ina (International title: Lend Me a Mom / ) is a 2011 Philippine television drama series broadcast by GMA Network. Directed by Joel Lamangan, it stars Bea Binene and Carmina Villarroel. It premiered on August 15, 2011 on the network's Dramarama sa Hapon line up replacing Blusang Itim. The series concluded on November 11, 2011 with a total of 65 episodes. It was replaced by Kokak in its timeslot.

Cast and characters

Lead cast
 Carmina Villarroel as Emily Martinez
 Bea Binene as Bernadette "Berna" Martinez

Supporting cast
 Martin Delos Santos as Andoy Martinez
 Jake Vargas as Luke Velasco
 Maxene Magalona as Andrea Martinez
 Marco Alcaraz as Ryan Perez
 Antonio Aquitania as Johnny Velasco
 Bubbles Paraiso as Eloisa Delos Santos
 Chynna Ortaleza as Sophia
 Jim Pebengco as Karyo
 Tony Mabesa as Carlos
 Rita Iringan as Nenet
 Shyr Valdez as Veron
 Mike Magat as Egay

Ratings
According to AGB Nielsen Philippines' Mega Manila household television ratings, the pilot episode of Pahiram ng Isang Ina earned a 14.4% rating. While the final episode scored a 21.7% rating.

References

External links
 

2011 Philippine television series debuts
2011 Philippine television series endings
Filipino-language television shows
GMA Network drama series
Television shows set in the Philippines